
von Trapp Brewing is a brewery in Stowe, Vermont, United States. Founded in 2010, as Trapp Lager, it is part of the Trapp Family businesses. The brewery, owned by Sam von Trapp, produces around 2,000 barrels of beer per year. It was the brainchild of Sam's father, Johannes, one of the three children of Georg and Maria von Trapp. The project was delayed, partly because it took almost two years to complete the EB-5  process. Its products are available in twelve states, as of 2022.

In September 2016, the family opened the von Trapp Bierhall on Luce Hill Road, around a mile down the hill from Trapp Family Lodge, which serves food and beverages. The beers are sold on-site. After initially being available only in Vermont, in 2015 they expanded sales into New Hampshire and Massachusetts. They are now also available in Connecticut, Maine, Maryland, New Jersey, New York, Pennsylvania, Rhode Island, Virginia and Washington, D.C.

Range of beers
The brewery currently produces six year-round beers, with a further nine being either specialty creations or part of a rotation.

The current year-round offerings are:

 Golden Helles (4.9% alcohol by volume)
 Kölsch-style (5.0)
 Keller Lager (5.0)
 Vienna-style (5.2)
 Bohemian Pilsner (5.4)
 Dunkel Lager (5.7)

The rotational or specialty beers are:

 Radler Trail Bier (3.9% abv) (specialty)
 Berliner Weisse-style (4.2) (rotational)
 Natur Helles (4.9) (rotational)
 Stowe-style Dry-Hopped Kölsch-style Collaboration (5.0) (specialty)
 Bavarian Pilsner (5.0) (rotational)
 Oktoberfest Lager (5.6) (rotational)
 Trösten Lager (6.0) (specialty)
 Maple Rauch (6.2) (specialty)
 Stowe-style Helles Bock (6.9) (specialty)

Facilities

See also 

 List of Vermont breweries
 Beer in the United States

References

External links 

 Official website

Beer brewing companies based in Vermont
2010 establishments in Vermont
American companies established in 2010
Buildings and structures in Stowe, Vermont